Slavina is a genus of annelids belonging to the family Naididae.

The genus has cosmopolitan distribution.

Species:

Slavina appendiculata 
Slavina evelinae 
Slavina isochaeta 
Slavina proceriseta 
Slavina sawayai

References

Annelids